The Statue of Amenemhat III in the Egyptian Museum in Berlin (inv. no. 1121) was found in 1854 by Joseph Hekekyan (1807–1875) at Memphis in Egypt. It was bought by the Egyptian Museum in 1855. The statue is one of the highlights of the Egyptian Museum in Berlin and one of the most important sculptures of Ancient Egypt in general. 

The statue is made of granodiorite and is 200 cm high. It shows the Middle Kingdom Egyptian king Amenemhat III in a position of praying. He wears a nemes head dress and a long garment. The throne name of the king is still preserved on the belt. In the Egyptian 19th Dynasty, the statue was resin-scribed by king Merenptah. His names and titles are on the back pillar. It seems that in ancient times, under Merenptah the face was reworked too and once covered with plaster and the painted.

The face shows an ageless king. There are two types of statues representing the king. Many statues showing a mature face with clear signs of age, while others show an ageless man. The Berlin statue clearly belongs to the latter type.

References

External links 

1854 archaeological discoveries
Memphis, Egypt
Archaeological discoveries in Egypt
Sculptures of the Berlin State Museums
Sculptures of ancient Egypt
Amenemhat III
Egyptological objects of the Berlin State Museums